The 1989 Ms. Olympia contest was an IFBB professional bodybuilding competition was held in 1989 in New York City, New York. It was the 10th Ms. Olympia competition held.

Results

See also
 1989 Mr. Olympia

References

 1989 Ms Olympia Results

External links
 Competitor History of the Ms. Olympia

Ms Olympia, 1989
Ms. Olympia

Ms. Olympia
History of female bodybuilding